Old St. Mary's, Old St Mary's, or Old Saint Mary's may refer to:

Old St. Mary's Church (Cincinnati, Ohio), church in United States
Old St Mary's, Walmer, church in Kent, England
Old St. Mary's Church (Milwaukee, Wisconsin), church in United States
Old St. Mary's Catholic Church (Fredericksburg, Texas), church in United States
Old St Mary's Church, West Bergholt, church in Essex, England
Old Saint Mary's Cathedral, cathedral in San Francisco, California, United States
Old St. Mary's Church (Clonmel), church in Clonmel, Ireland
St. Mary's Roman Catholic Church (Philadelphia), also known as Old St. Mary's